

Current listings

|}

Former listings

|}

References

Ferry